The École nationale supérieure des beaux-arts de Lyon is a school of art and design in Lyon, located in Les Subsistances, in the 1st arrondissement of Lyon, in the Rhône-Alpes region of France. It is part of the École des Beaux-Arts tradition, that established the Beaux-Arts architecture style.

History
It was founded in 1756 by abbé Lacroix-Laval and a group of art lovers. The school of drawing was free of charge and, owing to its royal charter for academies in the provinces, in 1780 it became the École Royale académique de dessin et géométrie and became one of the earliest French art schools outside Paris.

Recent Directors
1960-1974 : Jean Coquet
1974-1992 : Philippe Nahoum
1992-1998 : Guy Issanjou
1998-2011 : Yves Robert
2011- ... : Emmanuel Tibloux

Notable teachers

 
  from 1900 professor of Life drawing
  from 1939
 
 Patrick Beurard-Valdoye
 
 

 
 
 Veit Stratmann
 
 Olivier Zabat

Notable alumni

 Adrien Bas, c. 1902
 
 , 1836 to 1841
 , from 1891
 Jean-Marie Bonnassieux, 1828 to 1833
 Claude Bonnefond
 Jean-Baptiste Bouchardon, architect, sculptor
 Louis Bouquet, 1903 to 1907
 Camille Bouvagne, c. 1883 to 1887
 Fleury Chenu
 , c. 1902
 Léon Couturier
 Lionel Estève, c. 1980
 Louis Deschamps (painter)
 Germain Détanger, from 1860
 Antoine Duclaux
 , 1784
 Hippolyte Flandrin, from 1828
 Michel Philibert Genod
 François Guiguet
 Léonie Humbert-Vignot, c. 1894
 Jean-Marie Jacomin, painter
 , 1890 to 1896
 Jean-François Legendre-Héral, sculptor
 Alphonse Legros, c. 1855
 
 , c. 1833
 Jean Seignemartin, 1860 to 1865
 Nicolas Sicard
 Tony Tollet, 1873 to 1879
 Anthelme Trimolet
 Jean-Baptiste Vietty, c. 1807
 , 1939 to 1940*

References

External links

Portal of Écoles d'Art en Région Rhône-Alpes

.Lyon
Universities and colleges in Lyon
1st arrondissement of Lyon
Beaux-arts de Lyon
Beaux-arts de Lyon
Culture in Lyon
Educational institutions established in 1756
1756 establishments in France